Emil Fuchs (13 May 1874, Beerfelden, Grand Duchy of Hesse – 13 February 1971) was a German theologian, the son of Georg Friedrich Fuchs and Auguste Louise Wilhelmine Lonni Hauss.

A religious socialist, Fuchs was one of the first Lutheran pastors to join the Social Democratic Party of Germany. As a devoted pacifist, he later joined the Religious Society of Friends (Quakers). He was a Fellowship holder at Woodbrooke College (now Woodbrooke Quaker Study Centre), Selly Oak, Birmingham from 1934 to 1935.

Fuchs was both a committed Christian and socialist and wrote numerous books on the relationship of Marxism and Christianity. In 1958 Fuchs became honorary member of the East German CDU, that was part of the East German government and pursued a pro-communist course. On 9 February 1961 Fuchs was member of a Christian commission that was charged with discussing the issues of state and church with the GDR leader Walter Ulbricht. Since then Emil Fuchs engaged for normalisation of relations between the state and church in East Germany. Though a loyal GDR supporter Fuchs occasionally opposed the party line: he was against the persecution of the Young Congregations (Junge Gemeinden) in 1950s and when conscription was introduced in East Germany, he managed to persuade the communist leadership to allow an alternative for armed service. Men who refused usual service in the army could accordingly serve as 'construction soldiers' (Bausoldaten), who, as evident from the term, did mostly construction tasks.

In 1906 he married Else Wagner (1875–1931), who later committed suicide. They had four children: Elisabeth (1908–1939, suicide), Gerhard (1909–1951), Klaus (1911–1988) and Kristel (1913–2008). His son Klaus Fuchs, a physicist, was an atomic spy, convicted of supplying information from the British and American atomic bomb research to the USSR during, and shortly after, World War II.

References

External links
 

1874 births
1971 deaths
People from Beerfelden
People from the Grand Duchy of Hesse
Converts to Quakerism
German Lutheran theologians
German Quakers
German Democratic Party politicians
Quaker theologians
Social Democratic Party of Germany politicians
Christian Democratic Union (East Germany) politicians
Reichsbanner Schwarz-Rot-Gold members
Christian Peace Conference members
German Christian pacifists
Lutheran pacifists
German Christian socialists
Recipients of the Patriotic Order of Merit
Recipients of the Banner of Labor
East German people
20th-century German Protestant theologians
German male non-fiction writers
Quaker socialists
Lutheran socialists
Christian socialist theologians